Red Hot Patriot: The Kick-Ass Wit of Molly Ivins is a 2010 play written by twin sisters Margaret Engel and Allison Engel.

Kathleen Turner portrayed Ivins in the play's 2010 debut, the play was directed by David Esbjornson.

Overview
A one-actor play based on the life of Texas political writer Molly Ivins.

References

External links
Samuel French

2010 plays
Plays for one performer
Monodrama
Biographical plays about writers
Plays based on real people
American plays